Santolo Cirillo (active first half of 18th century, died 1742) was an Italian painter, engraver, and stucco artist, active in Naples. He was born in Grumo Nevano, a town near Naples. He contributed frescoes and paintings the Cathedral of San Gennaro, the Basilica of Santa Restituta, and Santa Donna Regina Nuova in Naples. He also painted for the Basilica di San Tammaro in his home town of Grumo Nevano. He frescoed in 1733 a Miracle of San Domenico and a San Pio in Prayer for Santa Caterina a Formiello, painted in the style of Paolo de Matteis.

References

1742 deaths
People from the Province of Naples
18th-century Italian painters
Italian male painters
Painters from Naples
Italian Baroque painters
Year of birth unknown
18th-century Italian male artists